Mika Partanen (born October 18, 1992) is a Finnish ice hockey player. He is currently playing with Vålerenga Ishockey in the Norwegian Fjordkraftligaen.

Partanen made his Liiga debut playing with HIFK during the 2013–14 Liiga season.

References

External links

1992 births
Living people
Finnish ice hockey forwards
HIFK (ice hockey) players
Ice hockey people from Helsinki